William Pollard was appointed Dean of Bangor in June 1410, but exchanged it for the rectory of Newchurch, Kent a month later.

References

15th-century Welsh Roman Catholic priests
Deans of Bangor